Gwenda Thomas (born 22 January 1942 in Neath) is a Welsh Labour politician.  Thomas was first elected to the National Assembly for Wales in 1999 and re-elected in 2003, having almost doubled her majority. She is a fluent Welsh speaker. She is a member of the GMB Union.

She was re-elected as Welsh Labour's Assembly Member for Neath on 3 May 2007 for a third 4-year term in office, with a majority reduced from 4,946 to 1,944, and a loss of 398 votes from the 2003 Assembly election.  In the 2011 Assembly election, Thomas increased her majority to 6,390.

Responsibilities in the Welsh Assembly
She was Chair of the assembly's Equality of Opportunity Committee and was appointed in December 2003 by the First Minister for Wales, Rhodri Morgan, to chair a review into safeguarding vulnerable children in Wales.  The review's report - Keeping Us Safe - was published on 3 May 2006.  She was also a member of the Local Government and Public Services, Voluntary Sector Partnership, South Wales West Regional, and Standards committees in the National Assembly.
 
In the Third Assembly she was appointed Deputy Minister for Health and Social Services (31 May 2007).  She has special responsibility for social services.  She retained the position of Deputy Minister for Social Services when the coalition government of Labour and Plaid Cymru was announced on 19 July.

In the Fourth Assembly, she held the position of Deputy Minister for Children and Social Services, with her responsibilities amongst others being childcare, child trust funds and parenting programmes.

History

In the first Assembly (1999-2003), she was Chair of the Local Government and Housing committee.

Mrs Thomas served on West Glamorgan County Council as Chair of the Social Services Committee - the first female councillor to chair such a major committee. She later served in the same position on Neath Port Talbot County Borough Council following local government reorganisation in 1995.

Educated at Pontardawe Grammar School, she worked in the County Courts Division of the Lord Chancellor's Department and at the Benefits Agency as an Executive officer for many years.

Mrs Thomas is a campaigner for carers' rights and a past member of the Lord Chancellor's Advisory Committee. Her interests include health, social services, children's issues, local government and the voluntary sector.

Personal life
Thomas was educated at Pontardawe Grammar School, she lives in Gwaun-Cae-Gurwen. Thomas was married to her late husband Morgan (1939-2013) for nearly 50 years and they have one son, Geraint and a granddaughter, Charlotte.

On 10 January 2017 she received an honorary doctorate from Swansea University.

External links
Welsh Labour Party Website
Website of the Welsh Assembly Government

Offices held

References

1942 births
Living people
Councillors in Wales
Welsh Labour members of the Senedd
Female members of the Senedd
People from Neath
Wales AMs 1999–2003
Wales AMs 2003–2007
Wales AMs 2007–2011
Wales AMs 2011–2016
Members of the Welsh Assembly Government
20th-century British women politicians
Women members of the Welsh Assembly Government
Women councillors in Wales
Civil servants in the Lord Chancellor's Department